The Pacific International was a passenger train operated by Amtrak between Seattle, Washington and Vancouver, British Columbia. It was Amtrak's first international train service, operating from 1972 until 1981.

History 

Amtrak did not retain any cross-border services when it assumed control of most intercity passenger trains in the United States on May 1, 1971. As part of its 1972 appropriation for Amtrak the United States Congress directed that $2 million be used for the establishment of service to Vancouver, Montreal (the Montrealer), and Nuevo Laredo (the Inter-American). The Burlington Northern Railroad's International had served the Seattle–Vancouver route up until the creation of Amtrak, and resuming service posed no significant challenges. The first Pacific International, Amtrak's first international train, ran on July 17, 1972. The train was scheduled to connect with the Los Angeles–Seattle Coast Starlight in both directions. Between October 1979 and April 1980 the southbound Pacific International began departing from Vancouver in the middle of the day and terminated in Portland, Oregon.

On paper, the Pacific International should have been a success. Rail service had operated between Seattle and Vancouver for most of the 20th century. However, the train struggled to attract riders throughout its history. In 1975 the United States Department of Transportation said it was the worst performer in the system, with a deficit of 47 cents per passenger mile. Critics of the train noted the influence of Senator Warren Magnuson (D-Washington) in establishing the service. In early 1979, Secretary of Transportation Brock Adams proposed eliminating 43% of Amtrak's route network, and the Pacific International was on the chopping block. In the end Congress agreed to fewer, though still significant, cuts, and the Pacific International survived for another two years. Amtrak discontinued the Pacific International on September 30, 1981, as part of another restructuring.

After its discontinuance Vancouver service did not return until the inauguration of the Mount Baker International in 1995. This route was folded into the Amtrak Cascades brand in 1998, and still exists today with two daily round trips, one from Seattle to Vancouver and one from Portland to Vancouver.

Notes

References 
 
 

Former Amtrak routes
International named passenger trains
Railway services introduced in 1972
Railway services discontinued in 1981
Passenger rail transport in British Columbia
Passenger rail transportation in Oregon
Passenger rail transportation in Washington (state)